Mitrella minor is a species of sea snail in the family Columbellidae, the dove snails.

References

 Gofas, S.; Le Renard, J.; Bouchet, P. (2001). Mollusca. in: Costello, M.J. et al. (eds), European Register of Marine Species: a check-list of the marine species in Europe and a bibliography of guides to their identification. Patrimoines Naturels. 50: 180–213

Further reading
 Scacchi, A. (1836). Catalogus Conchyliorum regni Neapolitani. Neapoli [Naples], Typis Filiatre-Sebetii 18 p., 1 pl
  Cantraine, F. J. (1835). [Diagnoses ou descriptiones succinctes de quelques espèces nouvelles de mollusques]. Bulletin de l'Académie Royale des Sciences et Belles-lettres de Bruxelles. 2(11): 380–401
 Calcara P. (1840). Monografie dei generi Clausilia e Bulimo coll'aggiunta di alcune nuove specie di conchiglie siciliane esistenti nella collezione della Sig. Teresa Gargotta in Salinas. Palermo, Muratori 54 p
 Risso A. (1826–1827). Histoire naturelle des principales productions de l'Europe Méridionale et particulièrement de celles des environs de Nice et des Alpes Maritimes. Paris, Levrault: Vol. 1: xii+448 pp., 1 map [1826]; Vol. 2: vii+482 pp., 8 pls [November 1827]; Vol. 3: xvi+480 pp.,14 pls [September 1827]; Vol. 4: iv+439 pp., 12 pls
  Philippi, R. A. (1844). Enumeratio molluscorum Siciliae cum viventium tum in tellure tertiaria fossilium, quae in itinere suo observavit. Volumen secundum continens addenda et emendanda, nec non comparationem faunae recentis Siciliae cum faunis aliarum terrarum et com fauna periodi tertiariae. Eduard Anton, Halle [Halis Saxorum]. iv+303: 13–28

minor
Gastropods described in 1836